André Lemoine was a French gymnast. He competed in seven events at the 1928 Summer Olympics.

References

Year of birth missing
Year of death missing
French male artistic gymnasts
Olympic gymnasts of France
Gymnasts at the 1928 Summer Olympics
Place of birth missing